Kunst (German for "art") is the eighteenth album by industrial band KMFDM. It was released on February 26, 2013 on Metropolis Records.

Background
Kunst features contributions from guest musician William Wilson and Swedish band Morlocks.  The album cover was designed by longtime KMFDM cover artist Aidan "Brute!" Hughes.  He said the album cover, a "chainsaw-wielding amazon", which Facebook removed from KMFDM's page, was created to support Russian punk rock group Pussy Riot and Ukrainian protest group FEMEN.  The song "Pussy Riot" was also written in support of the former.

Release
Kunst was released on 26 February 2013 on Metropolis Records.  The title track was made available on SoundCloud on 21 November 2012.

Reception

Track listing

Personnel
 Sascha Konietzko - vocals (1-8, 10), guitar (10), bass, synthesizer, drums (1-3, 6-10), loops (1, 3, 4, 6, 9, 10), recording, production, mixing
 Lucia Cifarelli - vocals (1, 2, 4, 6, 8), production
 Jules Hodgson - guitar (1-9), bass (7), drums (6, 7), recording
 Andy Selway - drums (4, 5)

Additional personnel
 William Wilson - vocals (5), recording
 Johann Strauss - vocals (9), keyboards (9), drums (9)
 Innocentius Rabiatus - guitar (9)
 Annabella Asia Konietzko - vocals (10), loops (7)
 Brian Gardner - mastering

References

2013 albums
KMFDM albums
Metropolis Records albums